Brachyistius is a genus of surfperches native to the eastern Pacific Ocean.

Species
There are currently two recognized species in this genus:
 Brachyistius aletes (Tarp, 1952)
 Brachyistius frenatus T. N. Gill, 1862 (Kelp perch)

References

Embiotocidae
Marine fish genera
Taxa named by Theodore Gill